Bertie the Bus may refer to:
A 1980 book by Ingrid Pitt
A character in Thomas & Friends television series